The discography of American country music singer Doug Stone consists of ten studio albums and 33 singles.

His self-titled debut album was released in 1990 on Epic Records. The album produced three top 10 singles, and a number one single, "In a Different Light". The album reached #12 on the Billboard Top Country Albums chart, and was certified Platinum by the RIAA. I Thought It Was You, his second album, was also certified platinum. It was followed by a Christmas album and 1992's gold-certified From the Heart.

A fourth album for Epic, the gold More Love, featured songs from the film Gordy, his acting debut. After a greatest hits package in 1995, he released Faith in Me, Faith in You on Columbia Records. This album produced no Top 10 hits, however, and Stone did not release any albums until 1999's Make Up in Love on Atlantic Records, followed by the unsuccessful The Long Way on Audium. In 2005, Stone signed to Lofton Creek Records. Since signing, he has released two studio albums for the label. Neither album produced a charting single.

Studio albums

1990s

2000s

Compilation albums

Singles

1990s

2000s

Music videos

Notes

References

Country music discographies
Discographies of American artists